The , meaning "count of days" in Nahuatl, is a Mexica version of the 260-day calendar in use in pre-Columbian Mesoamerica. This calendar is solar and consists of 20 13-day periods.  Each  is ruled by a different deity. Graphic representations for the twenty day names have existed among certain ethnic, linguistic, or archaeologically identified peoples.

Description 

Several theories have been advanced for this calendrical period: that it represents a Venusian cycle, that it represents the human gestation period, or that it represents the number of days between the zenithal passage of the sun in the tropical lowlands.

A  was designated by the name of its first  day. For example,  met Moctezuma II on the day 8 Wind in the year 1 Reed (or November 8, 1519 in the Julian calendar).

The  and the  would coincide approximately every 52 years.

Day signs

Gallery of day signs 
Note that the symbols are arranged counterclockwise around the calendar stone.

See also 
 Aztec calendar
 Aztec calendar stone
 Aztec mythology
 Maya calendar

References

External links 
 Discussion of origin of the 260-day cycle 
 Animated tōnalpōhualli 

Aztec calendars
Specific calendars
Obsolete calendars
Nahuatl words and phrases